A Perfect World is a Big Finish Productions audio drama based on the long-running British science fiction television series Doctor Who. It is a one part story which was released along with Time Reef, the story which precedes it.

Plot
Thomas Brewster requests a trip to the year 2008 and the Doctor obliges, little knowing that Brewster has been there before during the time he had "borrowed" the Doctor's TARDIS. Brewster's prior encounter with a young woman called Connie seems to have had a strange effect on the world, causing perfection to be the norm. Now the Doctor and his companions must discover what has caused this to happen and how can they put things right.

Cast
The Doctor — Peter Davison
Nyssa — Sarah Sutton
Thomas Brewster – John Pickard
Connie – Rebecca Callard
Phil – Nicholas Farrell
Taz – Beth Chalmers
Trev – Sean Connolly

Continuity
Brewster decides to leave the TARDIS at the end of this adventure, wanting to experience real life. He later encounters the Doctor again who is now in his sixth incarnation in the play The Crimes of Thomas Brewster.

Notes
With the exception of Rebecca Callard, all of the guest cast in this adventure also had other roles in Time Reef, as they were recorded together.

External links
Time Reef & A Perfect World – Big Finish
 

2008 audio plays
Fifth Doctor audio plays
Fiction set in 2008